The 2022 U Sports football season began on August 27, 2022, with four Atlantic University Sport teams, four RSEQ teams, and ten Ontario University Athletics teams opening their schedules that day. The six Canada West teams began their schedules one week later with two games on September 2 and one on September 3.

The conference championships were played on the weekend of November 12, 2022, and the season concluded on November 26, 2022, with the 57th Vanier Cup championship, which returned to the pre-pandemic scheduling used in 2019. The championship game was played at Western Alumni Stadium in London, Ontario for the first time in the game's history. 27 university teams in Canada played U Sports football, the highest level of amateur Canadian football.

Schedule changes
On April 7, 2022, the OUA released their schedule which featured a return to an eight-game format and no divisions or geographical restrictions. With the season starting in August and ending in October, this was more in line with the pre-pandemic 2019 U Sports football season as opposed to the truncated 2021 season. The 114th Yates Cup game was played on November 12, 2022.

The AUS released their schedule on April 13, 2022, as the conference also returned to pre-pandemic scheduling with eight games played by each team and two bye weeks. The Loney Bowl was played on November 12, 2022. Canada West also returned to eight regular season games and the Hardy Cup was played on the weekend of November 12, 2022. The RSEQ announced their schedule last which featured eight games over ten weeks and a Dunsmore Cup championship date of November 12, 2022.

Regular season

Standings

Post-season awards

Award-winners

All-Canadian Team

Post-season
The Vanier Cup was played between the champions of the Mitchell Bowl and the Uteck Bowl, the national semi-final games. In 2022, according to the rotating schedule, the Québec conference Dunsmore Cup championship team visited the Yates Cup Ontario championship team for the Mitchell Bowl. The winners of the Canada West Hardy Trophy visited the Atlantic conference's Loney Bowl championship team for the Uteck Bowl. These games were played on November 19, 2022, while the 57th Vanier Cup was played on November 26, 2022.

Atlantic University Sport

Réseau du sport étudiant du Québec

Ontario University Athletics

Canada West Universities Athletic Association

U Sports finals

National Semifinals

References

External links
 Official website

2022 in Canadian football
U Sports football seasons